Vinca difformis, commonly called the intermediate periwinkle, is an evergreen, flowering subshrub native to Western Europe, including the Iberian Peninsula, France, the Italian Peninsula and Sardinia. Its whitish-blue flowers have a blooming season from late winter to early spring. It grows to about half a meter, and forms mats over a meter across.

References

Plants Profile - Vinca difformis Pourret
RHS Plant Selector Vinca difformis

difformis
Flora of Europe
Groundcovers